Fashi Zhenwu Temple is a Taoist temple located in Fengze District of Quanzhou, Fujian, China. In 2021, the temple was inscribed on the UNESCO World Heritage List along with other medieval sites in Quanzhou because of its religious importance for maritime trade in China during the Song and Yuan dynasties and its testimony to the global exchange of ideas and cultures.

History
According to Quanzhou Prefecture Topography and Jinjiang County Annals, the temple was originally built in the Song dynasty (960–1279). Another says that the temple was first built in the Southern Tang dynasty (923–936).

Architecture
Now the existing main buildings include Shanmen, Bai Pavilion and Zhenwu Hall.

Bai Pavilion
The Bai Pavilion was rebuilt in 1870, during the reign of Tongzhi Emperor in the Qing dynasty (1644–1911).

Zhenwu Hall
It is the main hall in the temple for worshiping Xuanwu. A modern restoration of the hall was carried out in 1985.

Gallery

References

Bibliography

Taoist temples in Fujian
Buildings and structures in Quanzhou
Tourist attractions in Quanzhou